The 14682/81 Jalandhar City New Delhi Express is an Express train belonging to Indian Railways - Northern Railway zone that runs between Jalandhar City & New Delhi in India.

It operates as train number 14682 from Jalandhar City to New Delhi and as train number 14681 in the reverse direction serving the states of Punjab, Haryana, Uttar Pradesh & Delhi.

Coaches

The 14682 / 81 Jalandhar City New Delhi Express has 2 AC Car, 13 Second Class seating, 3 General Unreserved & 2 SLR (Seating cum Luggage Rake) Coaches. It does not carry a Pantry car coach.
 
As is customary with most train services in India, Coach Composition may be amended at the discretion of Indian Railways depending on demand.

Service

As the average speed of the train is below , as per Indian Railways rules, its fare does not include a Superfast surcharge.

Rake sharing

14682 / 81 Jalandhar City New Delhi Express shares its rake with 12459/60 New Delhi Amritsar Express.

Routeing

The 14682 / 81 Jalandhar City New Delhi Express runs from Jalandhar City via Ghaziabad, Meerut City Jn., Muzaffarnagar, Deoband, Saharanpur, Jagadhri, Ambala Cantt Junction, Ludhiana Junction to New Delhi.

Traction

As this section got electrified in 2016 Ghaziabad based WAP-4 or WAP-5 locomotive powers the train for its entire journey.

Timings

14682 Jalandhar City New Delhi Express leaves Jalandhar City on a daily basis at 04:10 hrs IST and reaches New Delhi at 12:50 hrs IST the same day.

14681 New Delhi Jalandhar City Express leaves New Delhi on a daily basis at 14:45 hrs IST and reaches Jalandhar City at 23:50 hrs IST the same day.

References 

 https://www.youtube.com/watch?v=rOu8msvfL1o
 http://pib.nic.in/newsite/erelease.aspx?relid=87360
 http://www.nr.indianrailways.gov.in/view_detail.jsp?lang=0&dcd=2829&id=0,4,268

External links

Transport in Jalandhar
Transport in Delhi
Intercity Express (Indian Railways) trains
Rail transport in Delhi
Rail transport in Haryana
Rail transport in Punjab, India